Behind 98, also known as formerly Di Balik Pintu Istana ("Behind the Palace Door") is an Indonesian drama film directed by Lukman Sardi, starring Chelsea Islan and Boy William. It was released on January 15, 2015. The film is themed around the fall of Suharto in 1998.

Cast 
 Chelsea Elizabeth Islan as Diana
 Boy William as Daniel
 Ririn Ekawati as Salma
 Alya Rohali as Bunda Alya
 Fauzi Baadila as Rahman
 Verdi Solaiman as Karumga
 Donny Alamsyah as Bagus
 Amoroso Katamsi as Suharto
 Teuku Rifnu Wikana as Rahmat
 Bima Azriel as Gandung
 Dian Sidik as Wiranto
 Agus Kuncoro as B. J. Habibie
 Pandji Pragiwaksono as Susilo Bambang Yudhoyono
 Asrul Dahlan as Sintong Panjaitan
 Iang Darmawan as Harmoko
 Dili Syaukat as Prabowo Subianto
 Eduwary Manalu as Amien Rais

References

External links 
 

2015 films
Indonesian drama films